Phrenology is the fifth studio album by American hip hop band The Roots, released on November 26, 2002, by MCA Records. Recording sessions for the album took place during June 2000 to September 2002 at Electric Lady Studios in New York. It was primarily produced by members of the band and features contributions from hip hop and neo soul artists such as Cody ChesnuTT, Musiq Soulchild, Talib Kweli, and Jill Scott.

Although it did not parallel the commercial success of the band's previous album, Things Fall Apart, the album reached number 28 on the US Billboard 200 chart and sold steadily, remaining on the chart for 38 weeks. On June 3, 2003, it was certified gold by the Recording Industry Association of America, for shipments of 500,000 copies in the United States. Upon its release, Phrenology received universal acclaim from music critics, who praised its musical direction and lyrical themes, and it was included in numerous publications' year-end lists of the year's best albums.

Background 
Following the breakthrough success of Things Fall Apart (1999), its release was highly anticipated and delayed, as recording took two years. The album is named after the discredited pseudoscience of phrenology, the study of head shapes to determine intelligence and character, which was used to rationalize racism during the 19th century in the United States. Its cover art was created by artist/printmaker Tom Huck.

Music and lyrics 
Primarily a hip hop album, Phrenology features lyrical themes of hip hop culture and its commodification, with musical elements of rock, jazz, techno, hardcore punk, and soul music. According to music critic Greg Kot, the Roots forge a connection between hip hop and neo soul on the album, while Treble writer says it can "best be described" as progressive rap, and Entertainment Weeklys Raymond Fiore calls it the band's "left-field rock-rap opus". A production of the Soulquarians collective, the album features contributions by Cody ChesnuTT, Musiq Soulchild, Talib Kweli, and Jill Scott.

On "Something in the Way of Things (In Town)", Amiri Baraka performs a poem about how the spirit of death and decay permeates African-American urban experiences. Set to a fusion of several African-American music influences, his poem observes "something in the way of our selves" and uses unusual imagery such as death "riding on top of the car peering through the windshield" and a "Negro squinting at us through the cage" with a smile "that ain't a smile but teeth flying against our necks".

Critical reception 

Phrenology received widespread acclaim from critics. At Metacritic, which assigns a normalized rating out of 100 to reviews from mainstream publications, the album received an average score of 87, based on 23 reviews. Mojo magazine hailed it as a "masterpiece", while Rolling Stone writer Pat Blashill said it has "a startling array of hip-hop reinventions". Dave Heaton from PopMatters called Phrenology "an impressive, ambitious work" that shows the Roots "filling their sound out and pushing it in a variety of directions", with a form of "tight soul/funk" that "sounds even more exact, funkier and edgier" than on Things Fall Apart. In the Chicago Sun-Times, critic Jim DeRogatis gave the record four out of four stars and called it "a near-classic right out of the gate, an urgent, raucous and thought-provoking 70 minutes that mine the musical territory between hard hip-hop and smoother Philly soul". Blenders RJ Smith called it "a celebration of self-determination, a nonstop joyride through some very complicated brains". Jeremy Gladstone from Kludge felt the Roots had combined "complicated beats" with "complex lyrics" to produce a "shockingly honest sound". In The Guardian, Alexis Petridis found the group "exclusively capable of absorbing other genres", while the "more straightforward hip-hop" is "idiosyncratic and hugely enjoyable". Slant Magazines Sal Cinquemani called the album "subtly progressive" and felt the lyrics "challenge the commodification and subsequent destruction of hip-hop culture".

In a less enthusiastic review, Uncut magazine said Phrenology shows the Roots' "willingness to push the envelope of their organic jazz-rap" that is unparalleled but sometimes musically pretentious or indulgent, particularly on "Something in the Way of Things" and the coda to "Water". AllMusic editor Steve Huey felt it is "a challenging, hugely ambitious opus that's by turns brilliant and bewildering, as it strains to push the very sound of hip-hop into the future." He also called it the band's "hardest-hitting" album because they successfully "re-create their concert punch in the studio." In his column for The Village Voice, Robert Christgau believed the Roots have finally discovered how to write tuneful and structured music on Phrenology, as they "humanize their formal commitment with injections of singing and guitar".

At the end of 2002, Phrenology was named one of the year's best albums. It was voted the seventh best album of 2002 in The Village Voices Pazz & Jop, an annual poll of American critics. The Rolling Stone Album Guide (2004) later gave it four-and-a-half stars and cited "Water" as a highlight, "that begins with the age-old Bo Diddley beat and ends as an extended musique concrète-style instrumental fantasia". Phrenology was included in the 2010 reference book 1001 Albums You Must Hear Before You Die and in Tom Moon's 1000 Recordings to Hear Before You Die (2008). Slant Magazine listed the album at number 231 on its "Top 250 Albums of the 2000s" (2010). Based on such listings, Acclaimed Music ranks Phrenology as the 19th most acclaimed album of 2002 and the 177th most acclaimed album of the 2000s.

Track listing 
Information is adapted from the album's liner notes. "(co.)" denotes Co-producer. Track numbers continued from Things Fall Apart.

Sample credits and notes
 "Thought @ Work" contains elements from the composition "Apache" by The Sugarhill Gang, "Jam on the Groove" by Ralph McDonald, and "Human Beat Box" by The Fat Boys. According to Questlove, recording artist Alicia Keys "drop[s] in" on the track.
 "Water" comprises three parts, noted in Questlove's liner notes as "a. the first movement / b. the abyss / c. the drowning", and contains elements of "Her Story" by The Flying Lizards.
 "Quills" contains elements of "Breakout" by Swing Out Sister and features guest vocals from Tracey Moore of the Jazzyfatnastees.
 "Pussy Galore" contains elements of "Because I Got It Like That" by the Jungle Brothers.
 On the CD version of the album, there are 18 tracks instead of 16: Tracks 15, 16 and 17 are silent blank tracks. Track 18 starts with another 2:00 of silence, and after that consists of two untitled songs, identified as "Rhymes and Ammo", originally from Soundbombing III (2002) and featuring Talib Kweli, and "Thirsty!", which is originally a track by Elektrochemie LK called "When I Rock".

Personnel
Credits for Phrenology adapted from Allmusic.

Musicians 

 Black Thought – vocals
 Sarah Chun – cello
 Omar Edwards – arp synthesizer
 Nelly Furtado – background vocals
 Michelle Golder – cello
 Kamal Gray – keyboards, theremin, production
 Jef Lee Johnson – guitar
 Alicia Keys – featured artist
 Talib Kweli – vocals
 Malik B. – featured artist

 Tracey Moore – background music
 Mos Def – featured artist
 James Poyser – moog synthesizer, strings
 Questlove – assistant engineer, drums, mixing, production, sequencing
 Rahzel – beatboxing
 Ursula Rucker – featured artist
 Jill Scott – vocals
 James Blood Ulmer – guitar
 Nuah Vi – cello
 Hope Wilson – screams
 Ben Kenney - guitar

Production

 Jon Adler – assistant
 Pablo Arraya – assistant
 Jim Bottari – engineer
 Andrew Brooks – assistant
 Cody ChesnuTT – producer
 Jeff Chestek – engineer, mixing
 Tom Coyne – assistant, mastering, mixing
 Kareem Da Bawl – producer
 Andre Dandridge – assistant
 DJ Scratch – producer
 Robert "LB" Dorsey – assistant, engineer
 Caliph Gamble – assistant
 Chris Gehringer – mastering
 Gordon Glass – assistant
 Jason Goldstein – mixing
 Kenny J. Gravillis – design
 Tom "Evil Prints" Huck – illustrations
 Ben Kenney – mixing

 Steve Mandel – assistant, engineer
 Carlos "Storm" Martinez – engineer
 James McKrone – assistant
 Shinobu Mitsuoka – assistant
 Kurt Nepogoda – assistant
 Richard Nichols – executive producer, mixing
 Omar the Scholar – producer
 Bob Power – mixing
 Kareem Riggins – producer
 Kelo Saunders – producer
 Jesse Shatkin – assistant
 Jon Smeltz – engineer
 Scott Storch – producer
 Tahir – producer
 Shawn Taylor – assistant
 Steef Van De Gevel – assistant
 Vince Vilorenzo – assistant
 Scott Whiting – assistant
 Ray Wilson – engineer

Charts

Weekly charts

Year-end charts

Singles

See also 
 Progressive rap
 Soulquarians

References

Bibliography

External links 
 
 "Between Grooves" by the Los Angeles Times

2002 albums
Albums produced by Questlove
Albums produced by Scott Storch
Albums produced by DJ Scratch
Albums recorded at Electric Lady Studios
MCA Records albums
The Roots albums
Progressive rap albums